Gordon "Gordy" Johnson, (born 1952) is an American double bassist and bass guitarist who has toured and/or recorded with Roy Buchanan, Bill Carrothers, Lorie Line, Chuck Mangione, Dewey Redman, Greg Brown, Peter Ostroushko, Paul Winter Consort, Cliff Eberhardt, Maynard Ferguson, Becky Schlegel, Benny Weinbeck, Bradley Joseph, and Stacey Kent. He is the older brother of bassist Jimmy Johnson.

Discography

As leader
 Gordon Johnson Trios (Tonalities, 1996)
 Trios V.2 (Tonalities, 2002)
 Trios Version 3.0 (Tonalities, 2005)
 GJ4 (Tonalities, 2008)
 Trios No. 5 (Tonalities, 2010)

As sideman
With Bill Carrothers
 Shine Ball (Fresh Sound New Talent, 2005)
With Laura Caviani
 Holly, Jolly, and Jazzy (Marbles: The Brain Store, 2013)
With Todd Clouser
 A Love Electric (Todd Clouser's A Love Electric, 2010)
With Dave Graf
 Just Like That (Artegra, 2005)
With Mary Louise Knutson
 Call Me When You Get There (Meridian Jazz, 2001)
 In the Bubble (Meridian Jazz, 2011)
With Chris Lomheim
 And You've Been Waiting? (IGMOD, 1994)
 The Bridge (Artegra, 2002)
 Timeline (Lomstradamus, 2014)
With Pete Whitman
 Where's When? (Artegra, 2002)
 The Sound of Water (Artegra, 2002)
With Irv Williams
 Finality (Ding-Dong Music, 2007)
With Eric Wangensteen
 It Had To Be You (2009)
 Blue Christmas (2012)

References
 
Gordon Johnson at JazzPolice.com
Gordon Johnson at BuffaloMusicMan.com

External links
Gordon Johnson at Tonalities.com

American jazz bass guitarists
American session musicians
Musicians from Minneapolis
Living people
1952 births
Guitarists from Minnesota
American male bass guitarists
20th-century American bass guitarists
Jazz musicians from Minnesota
20th-century American male musicians
American male jazz musicians
Paul Winter Consort members